Leah Peak is a  mountain summit located on the east shore of Maligne Lake in Jasper National Park, in the Canadian Rockies of Alberta, Canada. The nearest higher peak is Samson Peak,  to the north.


History

Leah Peak was named by Mary Schäffer in her expedition through the area in 1908 to find Maligne Lake. She also named nearby Samson Peak. Leah Beaver was the wife of Samson Beaver. Samson was a Stoney Indian who befriended Mary and provided her with a hand drawn map to assist her with finding the way to the elusive lake. Samson visited the lake with his father at the age of 14, and 16 years later he drew the map from memory when he met Mary at Elliott Barnes' cabin on the Kootenay Plains in the Saskatchewan Valley.

The first ascent of Leah Peak was made in 1926 by R. Ecaubert and J. Weber. The mountain's name became official in 1956 by the Geographical Names Board of Canada.

Climate

Based on the Köppen climate classification, Leah Peak is located in a subarctic climate with cold, snowy winters, and mild summers. Temperatures can drop below −20 °C with wind chill factors below −30 °C. Precipitation runoff from Leah Peak drains west into Maligne Lake, thence into the Maligne River which is a tributary of the Athabasca River.

See also
List of mountains of Canada
Geography of Alberta

References

External links
 Leah Peak weather forecast
 Parks Canada web site: Jasper National Park

Leah Peak
Mountains of Jasper National Park
Alberta's Rockies
Canadian Rockies